These are the official results of the Men's 110 metres hurdles event at the 1982 European Championships in Athens, Greece, held at Olympic Stadium "Spiros Louis" on 9, 10, and 11 September 1982.

Medalists

Final
11 September
Wind: -0.9 m/s

Semifinals
10 September
Wind: 0.4 m/s

Wind: 1.0 m/s

Qualifying heats
9 September
Wind: 0.6 m/s

Wind: -1.7 m/s

†: Petros Evripidou was initially assigned to compete for Greece, but there is only evidence that he competed for Cyprus.

Wind: -1.6 m/s

Participation
According to an unofficial count, 22 athletes from 14 countries participated in the event.

 (1)
 (1)
 (1)
 (3)
 (2)
 (1)
 (1)
 (2)
 (1)
 (3)
 (1)
 (2)
 (2)
 (1)

See also
 1978 Men's European Championships 110m Hurdles (Prague)
 1980 Men's Olympic 110m Hurdles (Moscow)
 1983 Men's World Championships 110m Hurdles (Helsinki)
 1984 Men's Olympic 110m Hurdles (Moscow)
 1986 Men's European Championships 110m Hurdles (Stuttgart)
 1987 Men's World Championships 110m Hurdles (Rome)
 1988 Men's Olympic 110m Hurdles (Seoul)

References

 Results

100 metres hurdles
Sprint hurdles at the European Athletics Championships